Hazleton may refer to:

Places
 Hazleton, British Columbia, Canada
 Hazleton, Gloucestershire, a village in Gloucestershire, England
 Hazleton long barrows, Neolithic burial mounds at Hazleton, Gloucestershire, England
 Hazleton Abbey, a medieval abbey in Hazleton, Gloucestershire, England
 Hazleton, Indiana, United States, a town
 Hazleton, Iowa, United States, a city
 Hazleton, Michigan, United States, 
 Hazleton, Missouri, United States, a ghost town
 Hazleton, Pennsylvania, United States, a city
 Hazleton Public Transit, Hazleton, Pennsylvania, United States
 Hazleton Regional Airport, Hazleton, Pennsylvania, United States

Other uses
 Hazleton Laboratories Corporation, an American drug development services company acquired by Corning Incorporated, now Covance, in 1987; see Covance
 FCI Hazleton, federal prison, West Virginia, United States
 Hazleton (EP), a 1998 EP by Fuel
 Hazleton Hawks, team in the U.S. Eastern Professional Basketball League, 1956–1962
 Hazleton Mountaineers, team in the U.S. Eastern Professional Basketball League, 1951–1952
 Hazleton Red Sox, U.S. minor league baseball team
 , a United States Navy patrol boat in commission from August to December 1918
 Hazleton massacre, Lattimer massacre

See also
Hazelton (disambiguation)